Fabio Cesari (born 27 May 1977) is a former Italian male long-distance runner who competed at one edition of the IAAF World Cross Country Championships at senior level (2006). He won one national championships at senior level (cross country running: 2006).

References

External links
 Fabio Cesari profile at Association of Road Racing Statisticians

1977 births
Living people
Italian male long-distance runners
Italian male cross country runners